Oocephala is a genus of plants in the family Asteraceae, native to Africa. The name means "egghead", referring to the egg-shaped capitulum, which distinguishes the genus from its close relative Polydora. Some species were formerly placed in the genus Vernonia.

Species
, Plants of the World Online recognises the following species.
Oocephala agrianthoides 
Oocephala centauroides 
Oocephala staehelinoides 
Oocephala stenocephala 

In 1999, Robinson described two Oocephala species: O. agrianthoides and O. stenocephala. In 2014, Robinson and Skvarla added two more species: O. centauroides and O. staehelinoides.

References

 
Asteraceae genera